Arctic naval operations of World War II were the World War II naval operations that took place in the Arctic Ocean, and can be considered part of the Battle of the Atlantic and/or of the European Theatre of World War II.

Pre-war navigation in the region focused on fishing and the international ore-trade from Narvik and Petsamo.  Soviet settlements along the coast and rivers of the Barents Sea and Kara Sea relied upon summer coastal shipping for supplies from railheads at Arkhangelsk and Murmansk.  The Soviet Union extended the Northern Sea Route past the Taymyr Peninsula to the Bering Strait in 1935.  The Winter War of 1939-1940 between Finland and the Soviet Union opened the northern flank of the Eastern Front of World War II.  The Arctic was initially dominated by the Soviet Northern Fleet of a few destroyers, with larger numbers of submarines, minesweepers, and torpedo cutters supported by icebreakers.  The success of the 1940 German invasion of Norway provided the Kriegsmarine with naval bases from which capital ships might challenge units of the British Royal Navy Home Fleet.  Luftwaffe anti-shipping aircraft of Kampfgeschwader 26 (KG 26) and Kampfgeschwader 30 (KG 30) operated intermittently from Norwegian airfields, while Küstenfliegergruppen aircraft including Heinkel He 115s and Blohm & Voss BV 138s undertook routine reconnaissance.  Following the 1941 Axis invasion of the Soviet Union, the Allies initiated a series of Arctic convoys to bring military supplies to the Soviet Union in formations of freighters screened by destroyers, corvettes and minesweepers.  Escorting cruisers typically maneuvered outside the formations, while a larger covering force including battleships and aircraft carriers often steamed nearby to engage Kriegsmarine capital ships or to raid the German naval bases in Norway.

The Soviet Union and Germany each deployed smaller coastal convoys: to maintain the flow of supplies to the Soviet Arctic coast, to transport strategic metal ores from Scandinavia to Germany, and to sustain troops on the northern flank of the Eastern Front.  Soviet convoys hugged the coast to avoid ice, while German convoys used fjords to evade Royal Navy patrols.  Both sides engaged in minelaying and minesweeping of these shallow, confined routes - vulnerable to mine warfare and to submarine ambushes.  Minesweepers and submarine chasers typically screened German convoys, while Soviet convoys were often protected by minesweeping trawlers and torpedo cutters.

A branch of the Pacific Route began carrying Lend-Lease goods through the Bering Strait to the Soviet Arctic coast in June 1942.  The number of westbound cargo-ship voyages along this route was 23 in 1942, 32 in 1943, 34 in 1944 and 31 after Germany surrendered in May 1945.  Westbound tonnage through the Bering Strait totaled approximately 10% of North American wartime goods sent to Soviet Arctic ports.  A large portion of tonnage though the Bering Strait was fuel for Siberian airfields on the Alaska-Siberia air route.

1939 - Early conflict and Winter War
 6 September 1939: Bremen was the first of 18 German merchant ships to take refuge in Murmansk after avoiding British naval patrols in the Atlantic.
 30 November 1939: The Winter War offensive against Petsamo was supported by Soviet Northern Fleet destroyers Kuibishev, Karl Liebknecht and Grozny.

1940 - Invasion of Norway 

 April 1940: Operation Weserübung included an invasion of Narvik by troops embarked aboard ten Kriegsmarine destroyers.  Covering battleships  and  briefly engaged ; and subsequent battles of Narvik involved Norwegian coastal defence ships Eidsvold and Norge, U-boats, and units of the Royal Navy.
 4 May 1940: The Polish destroyer Grom was sunk off Narvik by a KG 100 bomber.
 21 May 1940:  was scuttled after grounding on a shallow pinnacle off Narvik.
 4 June 1940: Operation Alphabet troopships Monarch of Bermuda, Batory, Sobieski, Franconia, Lancastria, Georgic, Oronsay, Ormonde, Arandora Star, Royal Ulsterman, Ulster Prince, Ulster Monarch and Duchess of York began evacuation of 24,600 Allied soldiers from Narvik.
 8 June 1940: With some of the longest range naval gunnery hits ever documented, Scharnhorst and Gneisenau sank the British aircraft carrier  and her escorting destroyers  and  during Operation Juno.
 9 July 1940: Raider Komet sailed north from Bergen and waited near Novaya Zemlya until 13 August 1940 for ice conditions to allow passage through the Matochkin Strait into the Kara Sea.  Komet proceeded east with the assistance of three Soviet icebreakers to enter the Pacific Ocean through the Bering Strait on 5 September 1940.  Soviet submarine Shch-423 made a similar trip from Murmansk to Vladivostok from 5 August to 17 October.
 25 July 1940: Admiral Hipper sailed for a two-week Arctic patrol.
 15 August 1940: Army transport  departed Petsamo for New York City carrying American nationals from Finland, Estonia, Latvia, Lithuania, Sweden, Denmark, Norway, Germany and the Netherlands.  American Legion also carried Princess Märtha of Sweden with her children, and a Bofors 40 mm gun manufactured in Sweden which became the prototype for American manufacture of the primary United States Navy anti-aircraft gun of World War II.
 25 August 1940:  and  sailed for a five-day patrol to Bear Island.
 16 October 1940:  launched an airstrike against the Tromsø seaplane base.

 4 March 1941:  and  covered the Operation Claymore raid on Lofoten.
 11 April 1941: HNoMS Mansfield destroyed the Øksfjord fish oil factory.
HMS Nigeria made a similar capture of the weather ship Lauenburg on 28 June.

1941 - Invasion of the Soviet Union 
 25 June 1941: The Soviet troopship Mossovet brought reinforcements to Titovka; and Soviet destroyers Kuibishev and Uritski landed additional reinforcements on 30 June.
 12 July 1941: Kriegsmarine destroyers Richard Beitzen, Hermann Schoemann, Hans Lody, Friedrich Eckoldt and Karl Galster attacked a small Soviet convoy near Cape Teriberski.
 14 July 1941: Soviet destroyers Gromky, Gremyashchy, Stremitleny and Kuibishev delayed a German infantry advance near Zapadnaya Litsa River.
 20 July 1941: The Soviet destroyer Stremitleny was sunk in Kola Bay by a LG 1 Junkers Ju 87.
 23 July 1941: Kriegsmarine destroyers Richard Beitzen, Hermann Schoemann, Friedrich Eckoldt and Karl Galster sank the Soviet survey ship Meridian near Teriberka.
 30 July 1941: HMS Furious and  launched airstrikes on Petsamo and Kirkenes.  Victorious launched an airstrike on Tromsø on 31 July.  These airstrikes turned back a patrol of Kriegsmarine destroyers.
 31 July 1941: HMS Nigeria,  and  destroyed a weather station on Bear Island.
The warships encountered a German troop convoy off Porsangerfjorden and sank the escort Bremse on 6 September.
 26 August 1941:  sank 3870-ton Mariya Ulyanova.
 31 August 1941: The Dervish Convoy arrived in Arkhangelsk initiating transport of Allied war materials around Norway to the Soviet Union.
 12 September 1941: Soviet submarine Shch-422 sank 1459-ton Ottar Jarl off Tanafjord 
 27 September 1941: Max Aitken, Lord Beaverbrook and W. Averell Harriman arrived in Arkhangelsk aboard .
 7 October 1941: HMS Victorious launched an airstrike against Vestfjorden.

1942 - PQ convoys 
 11 October 1941: Convoy PQ 1 escorted by HMS Suffolk arrived in Arkhangelsk.
 17 October 1941: Soviet submarine Shch-402 sank the 682-ton Vesteraalen in Soroysundet. 
 18 October 1941:  sank the 3487-ton Argun at the entrance to the White Sea.
 30 October 1941: Convoy PQ 2 arrived in Arkhangelsk.  Return convoy QP 2 departed on 2 November.
 24 November 1941: , Bedouin, and Soviet destroyers Gromky and Gremyashchy  shell Vardø.
 28 November 1941: Convoy PQ 3 and convoy PQ 4 arrived in Arkhangelsk.  Return convoy QP 3 departed on 27 November.
 3 December 1941: Soviet submarine K-3 was forced to surface after damages caused by German sub chasers UJ 1403, UJ 1416 and UJ 1708. Submarine engaged the Germans in gunfire battle and UJ 1708 was sunk, while the others retreated.
 7 December 1941: Anthony Eden arrived in Murmansk aboard HMS Kent.
 12 December 1941: Convoy PQ 5 arrived in Arkhangelsk.
 21 December 1941: Soviet submarine M-174 sank the 4301-ton Emshorn off the Varangerfjord.
 23 December 1941: Convoy PQ 6 arrived in Murmansk.
 25 December 1941: ,  and  formed gruppe Ulan patrolling south of Bear Island for PQ convoys until 14 March 1942.
 26 December 1941:  covered the Operation Anklet raid on Lofoten.
 11 January 1942: Convoy PQ 7 arrived in Murmansk after U-134 sank 5135-ton Waziristan.

 14 January 1942: Soviet submarine S-102 sank 1877-ton Turkheim off Sytlefjord.
 17 January 1942: U-454 damaged 5395-ton Harmatris and sank  from convoy PQ 8 as the convoy reached Kola Bay.  The German battleship Tirpitz was based at Trondheim, where its presence required the Home Fleet to retain at least one modern battleship which might have otherwise been used in the Mediterranean or Pacific.
 5 February 1942: Soviet submarine Shch-421 sank 2975-ton Konsul Schulte off Porsangerfjorden.
 10 February 1942: Combined convoys PQ 9 and 10 arrived in Murmansk escorted by HMS Nigeria,  and Intrepid.  The escort departed with return convoy QP 7 on 12 February.
 15 February 1942: Soviet submarine S-101 sank 1147-ton Mimona off Tanafjord.
 23 February 1942: Convoy PQ 11 arrived in Murmansk.  Admiral Scheer joined Tirpitz in Trondheim.
 5 March 1942: A Focke-Wulf Fw 200 located Convoy PQ 12 south of Jan Mayen. As part of Operation Sportpalast, Tirpitz sailed on 6 March with destroyers Hermann Schoemann, Friedrich Ihn and Z25. An unsuccessful airstrike from HMS Victorious on 9 March caused Tirpitz to seek refuge in Narvik.
 24 March 1942: Convoy QP 9 escort HMS Sharpshooter sank .
KG 30 Junkers Ju 88s sank 4815-ton Raceland and 7007-ton Empire Ranger as Kriegsmarine destroyers Z24, Z25 and Z26 sailed. Z26 sank 4687-ton Bateau before being sunk by Trinidad. Trinidad and Eclipse were damaged in the engagement.   sank 5086-ton Induna, and  sank 6421-ton Effingham.
 1 April 1942: Soviet submarine Shch-404 sank 2318-ton Michael off Tanafjord.
KG 30 Ju 88s sank 7164-ton Empire Cowper and 5486-ton Harpalion. U-435 sank 6008-ton Occidente and 5823-ton Kiev.
 19 April 1942: Convoy PQ 14 arrived in Murmansk after  sank 6985-ton Empire Howard.
 24 April 1942: Soviet submarine Shch-401 was lost after sinking 1359-ton Stensaas.

Kriegsmarine destroyers Hermann Schoemann, Z24 and Z25 sank 2847-ton Tsiolkovski and damaged Amazon. Schoemann was sunk by Edinburgh while the German destroyers crippled Edinburgh and damaged Forester and Foresight.
 29 April 1942: Soviet submarine M-171 sank 4969-ton Curityba off Varangerfjord.
In the covering force,  collided with Punjabi, and exploding depth charges on the sinking destroyer damaged the battleship.

 10 May 1942: Scheer moved from Trondheim to Narvik.
 14 May 1942: A KG 30 Ju 88 dive bomber sank HMS Trinidad.
 15 May 1942: The 11th U-boat Flotilla was established and based at Bergen for Arctic Ocean patrols.  Sturzkampfgeschwader 5 (StG 5) Ju 87s attacked Murmansk, damaging 6187-ton Yaka and Soviet submarine Shch-403.
 25 May 1942: Lützow joined Admiral Scheer in Narvik.  KG 26 and KG 30 damaged 5127-ton Carlton from Convoy PQ 16, and  sank 6191-ton Syros.  Continuing aircraft attacks sank Alamar, Mormacsul, Empire Lawrence, Empire Purcell, Lowther Castle, and City of Joliet and damaged Stari Bolshevik, Ocean Voice, Empire Baffin, and  before the convoy reached Murmansk on 31 May.
 1 June 1942: StG 5 Ju 87s sank 7850-ton Empire Starlight and damaged Soviet submarine Shch-404 in Murmansk.
 24 June 1942: A StG 5 Ju 87 sank HMS Gossamer in Kola Bay.

 June 1942: Shiploads of strategic materials begin moving westbound from North America through the Bering Strait over the Northern Sea Route taking advantage of Soviet neutrality in the Pacific War to augment supplies delivered by PQ convoys.
 4 July 1942: A He 115 sank Liberty ship Christopher Newport from convoy PQ 17; and KG 26 He 111s sank 4841-ton Navarino and damaged Liberty ship William Hooper and 6114-ton Azerbaidzhan.  Twenty-two more ships were sunk by aircraft and U-boats after the convoy scattered on 5 July to avoid attacks by German surface ships.

 30 July 1942: Soviet Pacific Fleet destroyers Razumny, Razyaryonny and Baku entered the Bering Strait and traveled west to reach the Soviet Northern Fleet on 14 October.
 1 August 1942:  sank 2513-ton Krestyanin off the Kostin Strait.
 16 August 1942: Scheer left Narvik for the Operation Wunderland two-week patrol of the Kara Sea.
 25 August 1942: ,  and  sank the German minelayer Ulm east of Bear Island.
 12 September 1942: Convoy PQ 18 escort HMS Faulknor sank  near Bear Island.   and  sank Liberty ship Oliver Ellsworth and 3559-ton Stalingrad on 13 September; while KG 26 and KG 30 bombers sank 5432-ton Wacosta, 4826-ton Oregonian, 6131-ton Macbeth, 5441-ton Africander, 6209-ton Empire Stevenson, 7044-ton Empire Beaumont and 3124-ton Sukhona.   sank 8992-ton Atheltemplar on 14 September; and  sank U-589.   sank U-457 on 16 September.  The 5446-ton Kentucky was sunk and 6458-ton Troubador damaged before the convoy reached Murmansk.
 13 September 1942: Convoy QP 14 sailed from Arkhangelsk.  On 20 September U-435 sank HMS Leda,  sank 4937-ton Silver Sword, and  sank .  U-435 sank 5345-ton Bellingham, 7174-ton Ocean Voice and 3313-ton Grey Ranger on 22 September.
 29 October 1942: Operation FB attempted independent routing of Allied merchant ships.   sank 6640-ton Empire Gilbert on 2 November. U-625 also sank 7455-ton Empire Sky; and Z27 sank 7925-ton Donbass on 7 November.
 17 November 1942: Convoy QP 15 departed Kola Bay.  A storm dispersed the convoy and sank escorting Soviet destroyer Sokrushitelny on 22 November.  U-625 sank 5851-ton Goolistan, and U-601 sank 3974-ton Kuznets Lesov.

1943 - JW convoys 

 31 December 1942: Admiral Hipper, Lützow, Richard Beitzen, Theodor Riedel, Friedrich Eckoldt, Z29, Z30 and Z31  attacked convoy JW 51B in the battle of the Barents Sea.
 1 January 1943: Soviet submarine L-20 sank 5472-ton Muansa off Kongsfjorden.  U-354 sank 2418-ton Krasnyj Partizan.
 29 January 1943: Soviet submarines L-20 sank 7007-ton Othmarschen off Cape Nordkinn and M-171 sank 3243-ton Ilona Siemers off Kongsfjorden.  U-255 sank the Soviet icebreaker Malygin and 1892-ton Ufa.  U-255 then sank 7460-ton Greylock from convoy RA 52 on 3 February.
 12 February 1943: Soviet submarine K-3 sank 8116-ton Fechenheim.
 26 February 1943: Convoy JW 53 arrived in Kola Bay with one ship damaged by KG 30 Ju 88s.  StG 5 Ju 87s damaged three more ships from the convoy on 27 and 28 February; air attacks on 6 and 13 March damaged another ship and sank 7173-ton Ocean Freedom.
 5 March 1943: U-255 sank Liberty ship Richard Bland and 4978-ton Executive from convoy RA 53.  U-586 sank 6076-ton Puerto Rican on 9 March.
 11 March 1943: The German weather station Holzauge at Hansa Bay stationed on the northern coast of Sabine Island was discovered by the Sirius Dog Sled Patrol. The Germans realized they had been discovered, and gave chase, forcing the patrol to abandon their equipment and run back to Eskimonæs.
 12 March 1943: Tipitz, Scharnhorst and  Lützow assembled in Narvik causing cancellation of Allied convoys through the summer.
 16 March 1943: Soviet submarine M-122 sank 4533-ton Johannisberger off Varangerfjord.
 29 March 1943: Soviet submarine S-55 sank 2297-ton Ajax. Also S-101 is said to have sunk her.
 7 April 1943:  sank  near Jan Mayen.
 29 April 1943: Soviet submarine S-55 sank 708-ton Sturzsee off Nordkyn 
 17 May 1943: Soviet submarine S-56 sank tanker 1118-ton Eurostadt off Kongsfjord. 3676-ton Wartheland was lightly damaged by dud hit from the same salvo.
 June 1943: The 13th U-boat Flotilla was established at Trondheim to reduce U-boat losses to Allied bombers patrolling approaches to U-boat bases on the French Atlantic coast.
 17 July 1943: Soviet submarine S-56 sank minesweeper M-346.
 July - September 1943: German U-boats operated in Kara Sea against Soviet shipping: U-255 operated near Novaya Zemlya as a refueling station for a BV 138. The U-boats torpedoed 3771-ton Petrovski and sank 2900-ton Dikson, 7169-tons Tbilisi, 2480-tons Arkhangel´sk and 4169-tons Sergej Kirov  in addition to 3 minesweepers and 3 other auxiliary vessels. However U-639 was lost after being intercepted and torpedoed by Soviet submarine S-101 .
 8 September 1943: Scharnhorst, Tirpitz and ten destroyers bombarded Spitsbergen as Operation Zitronella.
 23 September 1943: Tirpitz was immobilized in Kåfjord by Operation Source.

 4 October 1943:  launched an airstrike on Bodø as Operation Leader.
 12 October 1943: Soviet submarine S-55 sank 5381-ton Ammerland off Porsangerfjord.
 26 December 1943: Scharnhorst was sunk during the battle of the North Cape while attempting to engage convoys JW 55B and RA 55A.
 26 January 1944: Isegrim gruppe U-boats damaged HMS Obdurate and sank Liberty ships Penelope Barker, Andrew G. Curtin and Fort Bellingham from convoy JW 56A near Bear Island.  On 30 January  sank  with a G7es torpedo; and the convoy escort sank .
 28 January 1944: Soviet submarine S-56 sank 5056-ton Henrietta Schulte.
 24 February 1944: HMS Furious of the convoy JW 57 covering force conducted Operation Bayleaf airstrikes against the Norwegian coast.  Convoy escort  sank .   sank  with a G7es torpedo on 25 February.
 2 March 1944:  sank an 8340-ton merchant ship in Folda fjord.
 4 March 1944: U-703 sank 7062-ton Empire Tourist from convoy RA 57.
 28 March 1944:  was sunk by a mine off Bodø.

 2 April 1944: HMS Keppel sank , and other convoy JW 58 escorts sank .
 3 April 1944: British carrier aircraft damage Tirpitz during Operation Tungsten.
 30 April 1944:  sank Liberty ship William S. Thayer from convoy RA 59. The convoy covering force launched an airstrike sinking three ships from a German convoy near Bodø.
 26 May 1944: Soviet aircraft sank 3402-ton Solviken and damaged 3672-ton Herta Engeline Fritzen near Kirkenes.

1944 and 1945 - Last operations 
 17 June 1944: Soviet aircraft sank 1,610-ton Dixie and damaged 1,112-ton Marga Cords and 7,419-ton Florianopolis from a convoy near Hammerfest.
 17 July 1944: Unsuccessful British carrier attack on Tirpitz during Operation Mascot.
 31 July 1944: Tirpitz completed battle damage repair at Altafjord.
 17 August 1944: Soviet aircraft sank two merchant ships near Kirkenes.
 19 August 1944: Soviet torpedo cutters sank 3,946-ton Colmar from a German convoy near Persfjord.
 21 August 1944:  sank convoy JW 59 escort , and was sunk by Swordfish of the covering force aircraft carrier HMS Victorious.
 22–29 August: British carrier aircraft repeatedly attack Tirpitz during Operation Goodwood, but inflict only light damage.  sank  and damaged  from the British fleet before being sunk by escorts on 24 August.

 August–September 1944: German U-boats operations in Kara Sea against Soviet shipping resulted in the loss of three former American minesweepers  of the Admirable-class transferred to the Soviets under Lend-Lease: T-118, T-114 and T-120 in addition to the Soviet corvette Brilliant. However, only one merchant was lost: 7540-tons Marina Raskova (7540 GRT), in addition to a survey vessel. Germans lost U-362 after depth charges by Soviet minesweeper T-116 (another Admirable-class vessel transferred from United States).
 2 September 1944: Convoy RA 59 escorts sank .
 16 September 1944: Soviet aircraft sank 3668-ton Wolsum at Kirkenes.  Another attack damaged 5434-ton Friesenland off North Cape on 20 September.
 29 September 1944:  sank 7219-ton Samsuva and Liberty ship Edward H. Crockett from convoy RA 60.  No. 813 Naval Air Squadron Swordfish F of  sank  on 30 September.
 11 October 1944: Soviet torpedo cutters sank German minesweeper M-303 off Kiberg.
 12 October 1944: Soviet submarine S-104 sank 1730-ton Lumme east of Tanafjord.
 16 October 1944: United States Coast Guard icebreaker  captured the German weather ship Externsteine off Greenland.
 21 October 1944: Soviet torpedo cutters sank German minesweeper M-31 off Honningsvåg.

 26 October 1944: Soviet naval infantry captured Kirkenes with the support of Soviet Northern Fleet destroyers and smaller warships.
 12 November 1944: Operation Catechism: Tirpitz was  capsized by Royal Air Force Avro Lancasters.
 2 December 1944:  sank 1123-ton Proletari off Finland.
 9 December 1944: Convoy RA 62 escorts sank  at the mouth of Kola Bay.   torpedoed  on 11 December before being sunk by No. 813 Naval Air Squadron Swordfish from HMS Campania on 13 December.
 30 December 1944:  torpedoed 7176-ton Tbilisi off Kola Bay.
 December 1944: The 14th U-boat Flotilla was established at Narvik to absorb displaced U-boats as bases on the French coast were captured by Allied troops.
 16 January 1945:  sank Dejatelnyj with a G7se torpedo at the mouth of Kola Bay.
 13 February 1945: KG 26 Ju 88 and 188 torpedo bombers withdrawn from France following the Normandy landings made unsuccessful attacks against convoy JW 64.   sank convoy escort  at the mouth of Kola Bay.
 14 February 1945: U-boats sank 8129-ton Norfjell and Liberty ship Horace Gray from convoy BK 3 outside Kola Bay.
 17 February 1945: Escorts clearing Kola Bay for the departure of convoy RA 64 sank .   sank  and  damaged Liberty ship Thomas Scott and HMS Lark with G7se torpedoes.  On 23 February KG 26 sank Liberty ship Henry Bacon – the last ship to be sunk by German aircraft in the second world war.
 20 March 1945: U-968 torpedoed Liberty ships Horace Bushnell and Thomas Donaldson from convoy JW 65 and convoy escort  with a G7se torpedo.
 22 April 1945: U-997 sank 1603-ton Onega and torpedoed 4287-ton Idefjord from convoy PK 9.
 8 May 1945: Supply ships from the United States continue westbound through the Bering Strait along the Northern Sea Route to encourage the Soviet Union to declare war on Japan on 9 August 1945.

Notes

Citations

References 
 
 
 
 
 
 
 
 
 
 
 
 
 
 
 
 
 
 
 
 
 

 
Naval battles and operations of World War II involving the United Kingdom
Naval battles and operations of the European theatre of World War II
Naval battles of World War II involving the Soviet Union
Naval battles of World War II involving Canada
Military in the Arctic